Suffolk was a refrigerated steam cargo ship built in 1899 by the Sunderland Shipbuilding Co. of Sunderland for Federal Steam Navigation Company of London to transport meat and other produce from Australia and South America to United Kingdom.

Design and Construction
In mid-1890s, following continuous expansion of the frozen meat and produce trade with Australia and South America, Federal Steam Navigation Co. placed an order for eight refrigerated cargo vessels of approximate 9,000 deadweight to increase the capacity of their fleet. Suffolk was the fifth ship of the series, and was laid down at Sunderland Shipbuilding Company's South Dock shipyard in Sunderland and launched on 25 July 1899 (yard number 201).  
 
After successful completion of sea trials on November 20, 1899, during which the ship could easily maintain her contractual speed with a large load of railway iron and coal, she was transferred to her owners and immediately left for London. The vessel was constructed on the deep frame principle, and had a cellular water ballast both aft and fore. She had all the modern machinery fitted for quick loading and unloading of the cargo, including ten powerful steam winches and a large number of derricks. The steamer had a large shelter-deck built to carry large quantities of cattle or light cargo. In addition, the ship was fitted with refrigerating machinery of carbonic anhydride design, and chambers, insulated with silicate cotton, to carry chilled meat on her homeward journeys. Suffolk had also accommodations built allowing her to carry a large number of first and second class passengers.

Operational history
Upon delivery Suffolk departed Sunderland for London in ballast on November 20, 1899. While at London, she loaded a large general cargo consisting among other things of large quantities of frozen pheasant and deer, steel plates and rails and telephone cable and left for her maiden voyage on December 23 for Australian ports, reaching Fremantle after an uneventful journey on February 6, 1900. The ship proceeded to Sydney and then to Cairns where she unloaded 3,200 tons of steel rails. The ship was subsequently chartered by the Imperial Government to transport horses and provisions for the British army in South Africa.

In the Imperial Government Service
After finishing unloading, Suffolk proceeded from Cairns to the Queensland ports of Gladstone, Rockhampton and Brisbane to load frozen meet and other produce for delivery to South Africa and London. Next she sailed to Newcastle where she took on board the horses for the British army. The steamer left Newcastle on April 19 with a veterinary officer C. McIvor in charge of remounts on board. He, however, suffered a broken leg on a short trip to Albany and had to be disembarked there and confined to a hospital.  Suffolk arrived at Durban on May 28, and departed for London from Cape Town on June 25, reaching her destination on July 27, concluding her maiden journey.

Sinking
Suffolk left London for her final voyage on August 10, 1900 for Cape Town. She arrived  at Fiume on August 22 to load 1,000 horses for the 10th Hussars of the British army fighting in South Africa, but was only able to take on 930. The steamer left the port on August 24, coaled at Tenerife on September 3 and arrived at Cape Town on September 22 after largely an uneventful trip. She sailed out on the same day for Port Elizabeth, one of two main ports used to discharge cargo in South Africa. Suffolk was under command of captain John Cuthbert and had a crew of 63, including the captain. The vessel also carried 66 cattlemen, responsible for caring for the animals on board, and a veterinary surgeon. At 04:40 on September 23 the ship passed Cape Agulhas at a distance of about 11 miles, and the captain altered the course, and then did so again at 10:40 to a more easterly one. The weather was nice, and the seas were calm. Suffolk continued on this course until 03:20 on September 24, when the second mate, Charles Stokes, who was in charge of the ship at the time, heard the breakers and put the helm to hard-a-port but it was too late. Suffolk struck the rocks off Tzitzikamma Point, just past Cape St. Francis with her No. 3 hold and damaged her No.4, No. 5 holds and the stokehole in the process. The engine room and stokehole  got quickly flooded and the fires became extinguished. Fortunately, another steamer, SS Lake Erie was passing through the area, about 4 or 5 miles further out to sea, and she came by to inquire. As Lake Erie was way too small to tow a ship of Suffolk'''s size, captain Cuthbert decided to abandon ship at 12:30. The whole crew was transferred to Lake Erie who landed them safely in Port Elizabeth in the evening of the same day. Suffolk'' eventually foundered at 15:50 in an approximate position , taking all 903 horses on board at the time down with her.

An inquiry into the wrecking was held in October 1900 at Port Elizabeth, which found both the captain and the second mate to be at fault and negligent in their conduct. Captain Cuthbert had his license suspended for six month, and the second mate lost his master's certificate altogether.

Notes 

1899 ships
Merchant ships of the United Kingdom
Steamships of the United Kingdom
Maritime incidents in 1900
Ships built on the River Wear
Shipwrecks of the South African Indian Ocean coast